Destiny is a 1925 German silent drama film directed by Felix Basch and starring Lucy Doraine, Conrad Veidt, and Lia Eibenschütz.

The film's sets were designed by the art director Carl Ludwig Kirmse.

Cast
Lucy Doraine as Yvonne
Conrad Veidt as Graf L. M. Vranna
Lia Eibenschütz as Heddy
Hilde Radney as Ria Verene
Paul Bildt as Martin
Willy Kaiser-Heyl
Rolf Loer as Frederick Holm
Hadrian Maria Netto as Jockey B. Craddock
Eduard von Winterstein as Minister von Glayn
Friedrich Kayßler as Präsident H. Milner

References

External links

Films of the Weimar Republic
Films directed by Felix Basch
German silent feature films
1925 drama films
German drama films
German black-and-white films
Silent drama films
1920s German films
1920s German-language films